Sheikh Kamal International Stadium may refer to:

Sheikh Kamal International Stadium, Cox's Bazar
Sheikh Kamal International Stadium, Gopalganj